The 1990 Turkish census was held in 1990  and recorded the population and demographic details of every settlement in Turkey. Use of the data from the 1990 census centres on the question (in that census) related directly to the participation of persons in emigration: How many household members are absent now; are they in the country or abroad?

References

Icduygu, A., Sirkeci, I. and Muradoglu, G. (2001), Socio-economic Development and International Migration: A Turkish Study. International Migration, 39: 39–61. 

Censuses in Turkey
Turkey
1990 in Turkey